Marc Stacy Brown (born May 7, 1961) is a former professional American football wide receiver who played for the Buffalo Bills in 1987.

External links
Pro-Football-Reference

1961 births
Buffalo Bills players
Living people
American football wide receivers
Towson Tigers football players
Players of American football from New York (state)